Trecasali is a frazione of Sissa Trecasali and former comune (municipality) in the Province of Parma in the Italian region Emilia-Romagna, located about  northwest of Bologna and about  northwest of Parma.

The town houses the 18th-century church of San Michele Arcangelo.

Notable people
Vittorio Casaretti, footballer

References

Former municipalities of Emilia-Romagna
Frazioni of the Province of Parma
Cities and towns in Emilia-Romagna